History of type may refer to:
 History of printing in typography
 History of type theory in mathematics